Aphanomyces invadans is a species of water mould. It causes red spot disease, or epizootic ulcerative syndrome (EUS), in many species of fish.

References

Saprolegniales